The Kingston School of Art (KSA) is an art school in Kingston upon Thames, part of Kingston University London. It was first established in 1899 as the Kingston School of Science and Art. In 1930 it was established as a separate school and has been based on its own art school campus since 1939. It was disestablished in 1970 by becoming part of Kingston Polytechnic, but a re-brand in 2017 introduced the name again. It is the oldest constituent part of Kingston University, which was established in 1992. The School of Art plays an important role in the cultural and social development of Kingston.

The school teaches a variety of art-related subjects, including architecture, fashion, and visual arts. In the 2018/2019 academic year it will also begin teaching humanities and social sciences, which were previously taught by other schools of Kingston University. It had 2,801 students in the 2017/2018 academic year, 2,161 of which were Home or EU students. In the 2019 Guardian University Guide, it was ranked 6th out of 49 for fashion, 9th out of 67 for art, and 22nd out of 49 for architecture in the United Kingdom.

Notable students and faculty
 James Anthony Betts (1930-1934) faculty 
 Eric Clapton (1961), singer, songwriter
 George Fisher Gilmour (1934), artist, playwright, and filmmaker
 June Kirby (1928-2022), actress and model
 Tony Visconti, record producer, musician and singer
 David Chipperfield, architect

References

1899 establishments in England
1970 disestablishments in England
Educational institutions established in 1899
Educational institutions disestablished in 1970
Art schools in London
Education in the Royal Borough of Kingston upon Thames
History of the Royal Borough of Kingston upon Thames

2017 establishments in England
Educational institutions established in 2017
Kingston University